James Lang may refer to:

Sportsmen
James Lang (basketball) (born 1983), American basketball player
Jimmy Lang (1851–?), Scottish footballer
James Lang (cricketer) (1900–1973), English cricketer
Jim Lang (rugby union) (1909–1991), Welsh international rugby union player
James Lang (rugby union) (born 1995), Scottish international rugby union player

Others
Chris Lang (politician) (James Christian Lang, 1910–2002), Australian politician
Clubber Lang, James "Clubber" Lang, fictional boxer in Rocky III portrayed by Mr. T
Jim Lang (composer), American composer
Jim Lang (broadcaster) (born 1965), Canadian broadcaster and sportscaster

See also 
Jim Laing, Canadian play-by-play sportscaster for the Boston Bruins
Jim Lange (1932–2014), disc jockey, TV game show host & TV personality
Jimmy Lange (born 1975), boxer
James Laing (disambiguation)